Sheyko, also sometimes spelled Sheiko is a Ukrainian and Russian surname. It does not change according to the gender of the bearer.

Notable people
 Evgeny Sheyko (born 1962), Russian conductor
 Georgiy Sheiko (born 1989), Kazakhstani racewalker
 Sergey Sheyko (born 1967), Russian Naval officer and hero of the Russian Federation